Fredrik Thordendal (born 11 February 1970) is a Swedish musician, best known as the lead guitarist and backing vocalist for the extreme metal band Meshuggah, of which he is a founding member.
Along with Meshuggah's rhythm guitarist Mårten Hagström, Thordendal was rated No. 35 by Guitar World in the top 100 greatest heavy metal guitarists of all-time.

Career

Meshuggah

Thordendal began his career when he formed "Metallien", a heavily Metallica-influenced band, in his hometown Umeå in 1985. The band later changed their name to Meshuggah and released their first LP Psykisk Testbild in 1989. Beginning as a thrash metal band, Meshuggah's music gradually evolved into a more progressive sound. This sound has become influential on other bands, such as Periphery, whose core member Misha Mansoor was instrumental in coining the term "Djent" in reference to the commonly-utilised technique of playing heavily muted, extended powerchords found within Meshuggah's music. Thordendal has been widely recognized in the metal community for his work with Meshuggah. 

Some time in the 90s, before the release of Destroy Erase Improve, he was involved in a carpentering accident at work where he cut off the tip of his left middle finger; the fingertip was sewn back on, and after a fair degree of re-learning and practicing, he regained full proficiency on guitar within a year or so.

Fredrik Thordendal's Special Defects: Sol Niger Within
Under the name Fredrik Thordendal's Special Defects, Thordendal released a solo album in 1997 titled Sol Niger Within with Ultimate Audio Entertainment. The album was remixed and re-released by Ultimate Audio Entertainment and Relapse Records in 1999 under the title Sol Niger Within version 3.33. The re-release contains two bonus tracks but omits several parts of the original version. SNW's newly mastered version was also released for the first time on vinyl in 2016 by Husaria Records, an American label specializing in audiophile releases; the album's original material was pressed as both lacquer cut variant (500 units) and Direct Metal Mastering variant (500 units). Thordendal also featured on several tracks for drummer Morgan Ågren's Mats/Morgan Band.

With regards to a second Special Defects album Fredrik states "It's actually been messing with my head for years now. I haven't really found the time to get the project going. This is a project that I will work on for a longer time, with no rush whatsoever, to make it the best I possibly can. I'm looking forward to making it because I think it will sound so different from anything I've ever heard before".

Other projects and contributions

Thordendal has featured in numerous side-projects, such as XXX Atomic Toejam with Petter Marklund. The project had released a 7" two-track single "Celebration" under the name Sepülchre Inc., then took the moniker XXX Atomic Toejam and issued an MCD entitled "A Gathering of the Tribes for the First / Last Human Be-In" on Cold Meat Industry and also featured a track on the "Karmanik Collection" compilation. A full-length album was long announced, but never surfaced. Thordendal also played bass for Petter Marklund's solo project Memorandum and together with Marklund remixed tracks on the 1995 compilation album "Ars Moriendi".

In 2010, Fredrik recorded some drum tracks with Morgan Ågren [of Swedish prog-rock band Kaipa] and [Soilwork's] Dirk Verbeuren.

Several of Fredrik's demos have been released on the internet as MP3s or as videos on YouTube.  One composition entitled "Demo 33" can be found at https://www.youtube.com/watch?v=aYkSb7wtj0E.  "Demo 33" was used to demonstrate Fredrik's MIDI breath controller, which is used on several Meshuggah songs, one being Future Breed Machine.  More information regarding the controller can be found at http://www8.tfe.umu.se/personliga/jh/index.html (along with the original "Demo 33" MP3 and other demos of the device).  The site was created by Johan Haake, brother of Meshuggah drummer Tomas Haake, and the creator of the original MIDI breath controller for Fredrik.  Another demo idea, called "Secrets of the Unknown" can be found at https://www.youtube.com/watch?v=sMUXa6Q7B6I.

Thordendal is also a producer of some note, having produced all of Meshuggah's recent material and also releases for various other bands, Switzerland's Fragment among them.

Thordendal features in the Darkane track "Psychic Pain" from the album Insanity, performing lead guitar. Thordendal also contributed to the song "Asphyxiate" which can be found on Scarve's album Irradiant. He played a guitar solo on the title track of the Devin Townsend Project album Deconstruction.

He also made a contribution towards the soundtrack to the video games Wolfenstein: The New Order, released 2014 and Wolfenstein II: The New Colossus, released 2017.

Playing style and influences 
As a guitarist, Thordendal draws attention with his clean, complex lead-playing, inspired by jazz fusion guitarist Allan Holdsworth, and complex rhythm-playing featuring prominent polymetric passages. These characteristics are augmented by his use of seven and eight-string guitars. He has a large contribution to songwriting, as well as providing backing vocals for some songs during live performances.

Fredrik has been quoted as stating that Metallica and Tool as influences on Meshuggah. Meshuggah supported Tool during their U.S. tour in the fall of 2002, where drummer Tomas Haake even guest appearing, playing "Triad" with the band.

Fredrik praises jazz fusion guitarist Wayne Krantz's work with Keith Carlock and Tim Lefebvre, stating that "these guys are the most inspiring band I've heard in a very long time". He has also stated that he listens to Massive Attack and Cult of Luna.

In an interview with Guitar World in 2011 Fredrik states "My dad always listened to jazz, and I guess that influenced me to learn about improvisation. An improvised solo sounds so much better than a written one. For me, there's not much thinking going on at all, only a reaction to what I'm being told from the inside. And no, I have not had any formal training. When I record my leads, they are usually based on feel and totally ignorant to all laws of music theory. This, of course, is because I just play whatever comes out. There are no rules. But on certain songs, I do have to figure out what scales I need to use to follow chord changes. Since I'm not very good with all the scales, I sometimes have to write parts down and plan things ahead. I usually improvise the first part, then insert the written part and continue to improvise until the end of the solo. It's a very confusing way to do it, but I do whatever it takes to make it sound like I know what I'm doing".

Equipment

Guitars 

Thordendal's current main guitars are Ibanez Custom 8-String M8M which feature RG-shaped or Iceman-shaped alder bodies with 5-piece maple/Bubinga neck-thru necks (29.4" {746.76 mm}), rosewood fingerboards (no inlays), fixed bridge (actually an Ibanez FX-Edge fixed tremolo), one volume, one tone, and one Lundgren Model 8 pickup. The fixed bridge on one of his 8 strings has since been replaced with a Kahler tremolo system. Thordendal also owns a 7-string acoustic guitar, also made by Ibanez. For some time he also used Nevborn guitars. This company made Meshuggah their first 8 string guitars: however these guitars suffered from intonation problems, causing Thordendal to abandon the company and switch to exclusively using Ibanez guitars. On the current North American tour promoting Koloss, he has been using a custom Firebird, Iceman and Explorer type body 8 string, the Stoneman. The Stoneman features a 27" scale length, which Thordendal prefers, as mentioned by his tech in an interview with Premier Guitar. This guitar is in production by the name Ibanez FTM33.

Fredrik utilizes a unique device for his leads, referred to as the MIDI breath controller. He states "I was mainly interested in using it as a dynamics controller. I wanted to start a note at a lower volume and then bring it up, like a saxophonist does. But I've since found that is more or less impossible with a guitar. Since the controller didn't produce the sound I was after, I had to find other ways of using it. It turned out that the only thing that sounded cool was when I blew every single note with it, which generated this weird staccato sound. The first breath controller we made—the one I used on "Future Breed Machine" and "Sublevels" from Destroy Erase Improve—could only control the volume. So Johan Haake and I tried all kinds of things to get closer to what I originally wanted, like adding control over frequencies and distortion. I am really pleased with how the "Missing Time" solo turned out from Sol Niger Within Version 3.33 [the remix CD of the debut album from his side project Fredrik Thordendal's Special Defects]. But I never thought we got close enough, so I sort of gave up on it. A couple of years ago it was for sale to the public, but not any more".

Tuning:
For early Meshuggah releases, Fredrik tuned his 7 strings in B♭ tuning (a half step below standard tuning on a 7-string guitar). He followed suit when he started using 8 string guitars, tuning them down to F tuning (F, B♭, E♭, A♭, D♭,G♭, B♭, E♭). It was explained in an interview that they tuned their guitars this way because in the early days of Meshuggah, before Jens Kidman adopted his signature vocal style, it was easier for him to sing in the key of E♭ or B♭. Occasionally Thordendal deviates from his "standard" tuning: on the songs "Glints Collide",  "Organic Shadows", "Perpetual Black Second", "The Hurt That Finds You First" and "Stengah" he tunes the low F string of his 8 string guitar a half step lower to E, he also tunes it to E♭ on "Nebulous" and "Shed" and even to D on "Obsidian". On "Spasm" he tunes it even lower from that, down to B♭ (B♭, B♭, E♭, A♭, D♭, G♭, B♭, E♭), making the 8th string an octave below the 7th, while "Mind's Mirrors" utilizes the 8th string tuned down to E0.

Guitar strings:
DR Strings, Tite-Fit, LH-9 "Lite & Heavy" set: [.009 – .011 – .016 – .026 – .036 – .046], .052, .070 (stock gauges on the Ibanez M8M signature guitar)

Guitar picks:
Jim Dunlop 1.3mm Primetone Standard w/ grip
Jim dunlop 1.00mm Nylon Standard Picks

Amplifiers and effects 

Fractal Audio Systems Axe-FX II (for all cleans with effects and distorted guitar tones with effects)
Fortin custom Meshuggah Amp – (Single Channel 50-Watt, no effects loop, custom designed power transformers) (Ground-up custom built – turret board construction with point to point wiring – First used on 30 October 2016 live show in Toronto)
Two Notes Torpedo Live
Fortin custom boost pedal – (black stompbox pedal with a "33" logo on it).

Amplifiers and effects used in the past 
Randall Satan (2016)
Fractal Audio AxeFX ULTRA (2010–2016)
Line 6 Vetta II Head Units (2005–2008)
Line 6 POD Pro (2001–2005)
Marshall Valvestate 8200 (1992–2001; for live use only)
Mesa/Boogie .50 Caliber+ (1994)
Mesa/Boogie Dual Rectifier (1995–2001; for studio use only)
Marshall JCM800
Marshall 1960A cab
Rocktron Juice Extractor
TC Electronic Chorus & Flanger
Homemade "Les Amp" Head Unit
Homemade 1x12" Cabinet
Yamaha Breath Controller
Volume Unit (Yamaha BC controlled the amount of volume that the unit would allow through)
ADA Rackmount Delay

Discography 

Meshuggah
Psykisk Testbild (EP, 1989)
Contradictions Collapse (1991)
None (EP, 1994)
Selfcaged (EP, 1995)
Destroy Erase Improve (1995)
Chaosphere (1998)
Nothing (2002)
I (EP, 2004)
Catch Thirty-Three (2005)
Nothing – Re-issue (2006)
obZen (2008)
Alive (Live Album, 2010)
Koloss (2012)
Pitch Black (EP, 2013)
The Violent Sleep of Reason (2016)
Immutable (2022)

Fredrik Thordendal's Special Defects
Sol Niger Within (1997)
Untitled (TBA)

The Devin Townsend Project
Deconstruction (2011) (guest guitarist on "Deconstruction")

Gojira
Untitled Sea Shepherd EP (TBA) (guest guitarist on "Of Blood and Salt")

Mattias Eklundh
The Smorgasbord (2013) (guest guitarist on "Friedrichs Wahnbriefe")

Scarve
Irradiant (2004) (guest solo guitarist on "Asphyxiate")

Mick Gordon
Wolfenstein: The New Order (2014) (guest guitarist on "Herr Faust")

Grant the Sun
Sylvain (2019) (bass guitarist)

Jakub Zytecki
Nothing Lasts, Nothing's Lost (2019) (guest guitarist on "Creature Comfort")

Evan Marien
Emar, Vol. 3 (2019) (guest guitarist on "Requiem")

References 
[ Meshuggah] at Allmusic

External links 

 Thordendal's pedals explained

Swedish heavy metal guitarists
Swedish record producers
Meshuggah members
Avant-garde guitarists
Eight-string guitarists
Seven-string guitarists
Lead guitarists
Living people
1970 births
Progressive metal guitarists
Swedish experimental musicians
Swedish people of German descent